Mariusz Zawodziński (born 11 February 1989) is a Polish footballer.

Career

Club
He made his debut in the Polish top league - Ekstraklasa in the 2007/2008 season in a game against Cracovia.

In July 2011, he was released from GKS Bełchatów.

In July 2011, he joined Znicz Pruszków.

In January 2016, he joined Widzew Łódź.

In February 2017 he moved to Warta Sieradz.

References

External links
 

1989 births
Living people
Polish footballers
GKS Bełchatów players
Znicz Pruszków players
Omega Kleszczów players
Legionovia Legionowo players
Widzew Łódź players
Sportspeople from Bełchatów
Sportspeople from Łódź Voivodeship
Association football midfielders